A human being is a member of the species classified as Homo sapiens.

Human Being may also refer to:

 Human Being (album), a 1998 album by Seal
 "Human Beings" (song), a song from the album
 "Human Being", a song by Terrorvision from Formaldehyde
 "Human Being", a song by Robyn from Honey (2018)

See also
 Being Human (disambiguation)
 Human (disambiguation)